Hylodes caete is a species of frogs in the family Hylodidae. It is endemic to Serra do Mar, in the State of São Paulo, southeastern Brazil.

Etymology
The specific name caete is derived from two Tupi words, caa and ete, meaning "true forests".

Description
Adult males measure  in snout–vent length. It is the fourth member of the genus to found nuptial tubercles on the thumb.

Habitat
The species can be found in thick vegetative areas with fast flowing streams and clear water nearby.

References

caete
Endemic fauna of Brazil
Amphibians of Brazil
Amphibians described in 2017